This is a list of airports in Equatorial Guinea, sorted by location.



Airports

See also 
 Transport in Equatorial Guinea
 List of airports by ICAO code: F#FG - Equatorial Guinea
 Wikipedia: WikiProject Aviation/Airline destination lists: Africa#Equatorial Guinea

References 

 
  - includes IATA codes
 Great Circle Mapper - IATA and ICAO codes
 World Aero Data - ICAO codes, coordinates

Equatorial Guinea
Airports in Equatorial Guinea
Airports
Airports
Equatorial Guinea